KRPM (107.5 FM) is a radio station broadcasting a country music format. Licensed to Billings, Montana, United States, the station serves the Billings area. The station is currently owned by Radio Billings, LLC.

History
KRPM signed on as KULU on May 22, 2000. On October 20, 2000, KULU flipped to 1980s hits as 107.5 The River under the new callsign KZRV. The format later became Adult Contemporary, still as 107.5 The River. 107.5 changed call letters to the current KRPM on November 10, 2006 and changed formats to Rock as Rock 107.5, which it carried until March 2010, when it flipped back to AC as Magic 107.5. On June 25, 2014, 107.5 switched to a simulcast of KYSX as "Twang 105" and on July 3, 2014 "Twang 105" officially switched to "Twang 107.5" and K-Rock 105 debut on 105.1 FM, In 2015 K-Rock switch to Contemporary Christian Music as Cross Roads 105.1, and as of January 1, 2018 switched to Adult Contemporary Music as Classy 105. On May 28, 2018 Classy 105 was rebranded as 105.1 Star FM (operated by Radio Billings, LLC). 
Twang 107.5 & MOJO 92-5 are operated by Anthony Media.

References

External links

RPM
Country radio stations in the United States
Radio stations established in 2000
2000 establishments in Montana